Paul Okoumba d'Okwatsegue (30 December 1933 – 26 October 2020) was a Gabonese political figure and diplomat. Born in Franceville, Gabon, he was the Director-General of Radio Télévision Gabonaise in 1967.  He served as Foreign Minister of Gabon from 1974 to 1976. Later he was elected as Secretary-General of the Agency of Cultural and Technical Cooperation (ACCT), a francophone organization, at an ACCT meeting in Dakar on December 16–17, 1985.

As of 2005, Okoumba d'Okwatsegue was President of the Héritage foundation in Gabon.  He died of a lengthy illness in Libreville on 26 October 2020.  His wife Agatha, Gabon's first female lawyer, died some months before him.

References

1933 births
2020 deaths
People from Haut-Ogooué Province
Foreign ministers of Gabon
20th-century politicians
21st-century Gabonese people